The German Gyro Matto is a German autogyro, designed and produced by German Gyro Safety Aviation GmbH of Menden, introduced at the AERO Friedrichshafen airshow in 2013. The aircraft is supplied complete and ready-to-fly.

Design and development
The Matto features a single main rotor, a two-seats-in side-by-side configuration enclosed cockpit with a windshield, tricycle landing gear with wheel pants and a  GG 912 VT engine in pusher configuration.

The aircraft fuselage is made from a combination of carbon fibre and Kevlar.

The design incorporates a number of safety features, including a ballistic parachute mounted inside the rotor mast, which ensures that the rotor will not contact the parachute as it is deployed. Other safety features include a fire-proof cockpit, rupture-resistant and fuel tanks and anti-collision strobe lights.

Specifications (Matto)

See also
List of rotorcraft

References

External links

Matto
2010s German sport aircraft
Single-engined pusher autogyros